The 2015 European Darts Grand Prix was the ninth of nine PDC European Tour events on the 2015 PDC Pro Tour. The tournament took place in Glaspalast in Sindelfingen, Germany between 16–18 October 2015. It featured a field of 48 players and £115,000 in prize money, with £25,000 going to the winner.

Mervyn King was the defending champion, but he lost in the third round to Mensur Suljović. Kim Huybrechts defeated Peter Wright 6–5 in the final, coming back from 5–2 down in the process to win his second European title.

Prize money
The prize fund was increased to £115,000 after being £100,000 for the previous two years.

Qualification and format
The top 16 players from the PDC ProTour Order of Merit on 17 September automatically qualified for the event and were seeded in the second round. The remaining 32 places went to players from three qualifying events - 20 from the UK Qualifier (held in Barnsley on 25 September), eight from the European Qualifier and four from the Host Nation Qualifier (both held at the venue the day before the event started). The following players are taking part in the tournament:

Top 16
  Michael van Gerwen (second round)
  Michael Smith (quarter-finals)
  James Wade (semi-finals)
  Peter Wright (runner-up)
  Ian White (quarter-finals)
  Robert Thornton (third round)
  Kim Huybrechts (winner)
  Brendan Dolan (second round)
  Dave Chisnall (second round)
  Justin Pipe (second round)
  Jelle Klaasen (quarter-finals)
  Terry Jenkins (second round)
  Vincent van der Voort (second round)
  Simon Whitlock (third round)
  Benito van de Pas (second round)
  Mervyn King (third round)

UK Qualifier 
  Gerwyn Price (third round)
  Stephen Bunting (third round)
  Steve Beaton (third round)
  Mark Barilli (first round)
  Robbie Green (first round)
  Johnny Haines (first round)
  Johnny Clayton (second round)
  Mark Webster (second round)
  Jamie Caven (second round)
  Mickey Mansell (second round)
  Dave Ladley (second round)
  Mark Walsh (first round)
  Alan Norris (first round)
  Stephen Willard (first round)
  Dean Winstanley (second round)
  Devon Petersen (first round)
  Joe Cullen (quarter-finals)
  David Pallett (second round)
  Ricky Evans (first round)
  Lee Evans (third round)

European Qualifier
  Jermaine Wattimena (second round)
  Antonio Alcinas (first round)
  Raymond van Barneveld (third round)
  Mensur Suljović (semi-finals)
  Jeffrey de Zwaan (second round)
  Robert Marijanović (first round)
  Rowby-John Rodriguez (first round)
  Magnus Caris (first round)

Host Nation Qualifier
  Kevin Münch (first round)
  Jyhan Artut (first round)
  Stefan Stoyke (first round)
  Max Hopp (first round)

Draw

References

2015 PDC European Tour
2015 in German sport